KWJD-LP (92.1 FM) is a radio station broadcasting a religious format. Licensed to Onalaska, Washington, United States, the station is owned by Valley Life Broadcasting, Inc.

The station changed its call sign from KTYG-LP to KWJD-LP on June 27, 2016.

References

External links

WJD-LP
WJD-LP